Hvitfeldtska Gymnasiet, the "Hvitfeldtska High School" (gymnasium), is in central Gothenburg, Sweden. The school was founded in 1647 by Queen Kristina and is the largest in Gothenburg. It was originally called "Göteborgs gymnasium" and later known as "Göteborgs högre latinläroverk" before being named after its benefactress, the Norwegian-Swedish noblewoman Margareta Hvitfeldt (1608–1683), who left the larger part of her estate to the school. Hvitfeldtska has a sister school in Nairobi, Kenya: Eutychus Academy.

It is typically attended by students aged 15–19 coming from all over Gothenburg, and occasionally from other Swedish regions. International student enrolment is small but significant. Because of admitting students from lower all the way through upper class, there is a high socioeconomic diversity within its student population.

The school runs a variety of student clubs. It serves as one of the limited number of exam centres in Sweden for the SAT, ACT, and Oxbridge admission tests. Annually, some Hvitfeldtska students (also called Hvitfeldtare) get accepted to top summer schools and universities worldwide, and represent Sweden in international competitions.

Hvitfeldtska Gymnasiet is known for the events that occurred there during the Gothenburg riots of the EU summit of 2001. This did not involve the staff or the students as such, since, in the summer holidays, the school buildings were used for housing the participants of a youth convent.

The school is divided into three buildings: northern (the main building), western and southern. The library is in the southern building.

Education system
Hvitfeldtska is divided into four sections: Swedish/national (largest), French, German, and international (second largest). The school offers many Swedish secondary education programmes including "Naturvetenskapsprogrammet" (natural sciences), "Samhällsvetenskapsprogrammet" (social sciences), "Hvitfeldtskas Affärsprogrammet" (business), "Estetiska Programmet" (music), and "Handels- och administrationsprogrammet" (management). Students enrolled in the French and German sections travel twice to, and ultimately earn a diploma enabling them to study in France or Germany respectively; they also take the corresponding language courses. In fact, Hvitfeldtska is Sweden's first CertiLingua-certified school. The international section consists of an English-medium International Baccalaureate Diploma Programme (IBDP) and Pre-IB, which each year have only around 100 and 60 places respectively.

Additionally, Hvitfeldtska provides Gothenburg's widest range of language courses, study/travel abroad grants, and Individual Alternatives (IAs). IAs are programmes covering counselling, education, vocational internships etc. for students in the Swedish school system who temporarily require additional support. There are also collaborations with Chalmers University of Technology, University of Gothenburg, and other organisations to improve the educational experience for students. Undertaking international exchange study programs and summer internships are also fairly common in the school.

Alumni

Business
 Ingvar Kamprad, founder of IKEA
 Roger Holtback, Swedish industrialist, banker, and financier

Arts, media, and entertainment
 José González (singer), Swedish-Argentinian singer-songwriter
 Thomas Thorild, Swedish poet and critic
 Roy Andersson, Swedish film director
 Rune Andreasson, Swedish comic creator
 Tomas von Brömssen, Swedish actor
 Magnus Carlsson, Swedish singer
 Ulf Dageby, Swedish musician
 Arne Weise, Swedish TV personality
 Sven Wollter, Swedish actor
 Laleh Pourkarim, Swedish singer
 Little Dragon, Swedish music band
 Ebbot Lundberg, Swedish musician
 Anna von Hausswolff, Swedish singer-musician
 Bengt Lidner, Swedish poet
 Ida Redig, Swedish actress and singer/musician
 Sture Hegerfors, Swedish author and journalist
 Bosse Hansson, Swedish journalist, TV host and philatelist
 Kai Martin, Swedish musician and journalist
 Amanda Werne, Swedish musician and songwriter

Athletics
 Marcus Allbäck, football coach
 Josefin Lillhage, Olympic swimmer

Government and politics
 Dan-Axel Broström, Swedish shipowner
 Ernst Trygger, Swedish professor and politician
 Carl B Hamilton, Swedish politician
 Susanne Rappmann, Bishop of Gothenburg
 Lars Tobisson, Swedish politician
 Axel Vennersten, Swedish politician
 Jan Eliasson, Swedish diplomat
 Albert Ehrensvärd, Swedish diplomat

References

Education in Gothenburg
Gymnasiums (school) in Sweden
International Baccalaureate schools in Sweden
Educational institutions established in the 1640s